Chashtana (Greek:   (epigraphic),  ;; Kharosthi:) was a ruler of the Saka Western Satraps in northwestern India during 78-130 CE, when he was the satrap of Ujjain.

Name

Reign
Among modern scholars, the beginning of the Saka era is widely equated to the ascension of Chashtana (possibly to Mahakshatrapa) in 78 CE.

A statue found in Mathura together with statues of the Kushan king Kanishka and Vima Taktu, and bearing the name "Shastana" (Middle Brahmi script of the Kushan period) is often attributed to Chashtana himself. Chashtana is called Tisman by the bards, a spelling that matches the Greek rendition of his name more closely.

According to Ptolemy, Chashtana directly ruled Ujjain, while Paithan (Pratisthana) continued to be ruled by Siristolemaios (identified with Sri Pulumayi, son of Gautamiputra Satakarni). Ptolemy in his "Geographia", where he classifies the Western Satraps as "Indo-Scythians", describes Chashtana's territory as starting from Patalene in the West, to his capital Ujjain in the east ("Ozena-Regia Tiastani", "Ozene, capital of king Chashtana"), and beyond Barigaza in the south:

Chashtana was the grandfather of the great Western Satrap conqueror Rudradaman I. Chashtana was founder of one of the two major Saka Satrap dynasties in north-western India, the Bhadramukhas; the other, short-lived dynasty, the Kshaharatas ("Satraps"), included Bhumaka and Nahapana.

Coinage
The coinage of Chastana combines a corrupted Greek legend on the obverse, around his portrait, and a Brahmi script legend on the reverse around a "Three hills and river" symbol together with the sun and two moons.

Obverse: The obverse in Greek corrupted script typically reads "ΡΑΝΝΙω ΙΑΤΡΑΠAC CIASTANCA", transliteration of the Prakrit Raño Kshatrapasa Chashtana: "King and Satrap Chashtana".
Reverse: The reverse in Early/Middle Brahmi script reads:  RAJNO MAHAKSHATRAPASA YSAMOTIKAPUTRASA CHASHTANASA “Of the Rajah, the Great Satrap, son of Ysamotika, Chashtana". This legend is sometimes followed by the name "Chatḥaṇasa" in Kharosthi script.

References

Bibliography 
 "The dynastic art of the Kushans", Rosenfield
 

Western Satraps
2nd-century Indian monarchs
People from Ujjain